The 2006 North Alabama Lions football team represented the University of North Alabama in the 2006 NCAA Division II football season.

Schedule

Game summaries

Tusculum

Harding

Arkansas Tech

Southern Arkansas

Ouachita Baptist

Arkansas-Monticello

Delta State

Valdosta State

West Georgia

West Alabama

References

North Alabama
North Alabama Lions football seasons
Gulf South Conference football champion seasons
North Alabama Lions football